Beats of the Antonov is a documentary film released in 2014. It is a Sudanese-South African coproduction, directed by Sudanese filmmaker Hajooj Kuka and produced by Hajooj Kuka and Steven Markovitz. The film documents the Sudan–SRF conflict in the Blue Nile and Nuba Mountains regions, focusing in particular on the role of music in helping the affected communities to sustain themselves culturally and spiritually in the face of the ongoing conflict.

This documentary, that "put Sudan's name on the screen of world cinema", was made over a period of two years, with film director Hajooj Kuka residing among the people of the Nuba Mountains in Southern Sudan.

Premise 
The premise of Beats of the Antonov is that the core reason for the civil war in Sudan is an identity issue. Over many years, the central government in Sudan has enforced an Arab-Islamic identity on the other 56 major ethnic groups of Sudan. However, in reality Sudan has a diverse population with multi-cultural backgrounds. Through the documentary, Hajooj Kuka depicts the resilience of the people of the Blue Nile and Nuba Mountains areas of Sudan through life-celebrating music and dance, despite their daily struggle to survive in a war-torn society.

Reviews 
The film won the People's Choice Award for Best Documentary at the 2014 Toronto International Film Festival and was well-reviewed by Indiewire, Point of View, The Guardian, Variety and Africa is a Country among others.

Awards and nominations

Festival appearances

See also
 Cinema of Sudan

References

External links

Beats of the Antonov on Vimeo.com on demand

2014 films
2014 documentary films
Sudanese documentary films
South African documentary films
Documentary films about African music
Documentary films about Sudan
Documentary films about war
Films set in Sudan